Peter David Maurice (born 14 April 1951) is a retired Anglican bishop. He was the Bishop of Taunton until 30 April 2015.

Early life and education
Maurice was born on 16 April 1951 to Eric and Pamela Maurice. He studied at St Chad's College, Durham, graduating with a Bachelor of Arts (BA) degree in 1972. He trained for Holy Orders at the College of the Resurrection, Mirfield.

Ordained ministry
Ordained in 1975, he was a curate at St Paul's Wandsworth, then team vicar at Mortlake with East Sheen, then of Holy Trinity Church, Rotherhithe, Rural Dean of Bermondsey, vicar of All Saints', Tooting and finally, before his ordination to the episcopate, the Archdeacon of Wells.

In retirement, Maurice holds Permission to Officiate in the Diocese of Canterbury.

Views
On 11 February 2017, fourteen retired bishops signed an open letter to the then-serving bishops of the Church of England. In an unprecedented move, they expressed their opposition to the House of Bishops' report to General Synod on sexuality, which recommended no change to the Church's canons or practises around sexuality. By 13 February, a serving bishop (Alan Wilson, Bishop of Buckingham) and nine further retired bishops — including Maurice — had added their signatures; on 15 February, the report was rejected by synod.

Personal life
A sports fan, Maurice is married to Elizabeth, with two sons and one daughter.

Styles
 The Reverend Peter Maurice (1975–2003)
 The Venerable Peter Maurice (2003–2006)
 The Right Reverend Peter Maurice (2006–present)

References

1951 births
People educated at Marlborough College
Alumni of St Chad's College, Durham
21st-century Church of England bishops
Living people
Bishops of Taunton
Archdeacons of Wells